Maccabi Rehovot is a handball team from the city of Rehovot, Israel.

Maccabi won the first championship of Israel and were the biggest handball club in the country at the 1950s and early 1960s, they won 5 championships and have appeared in the finals of the Israeli cup numerous times.

In 2005 the team was rebuilt after 3 years of not competing, they got promoted back the top division in 2010.

Titles 
Israel Champions (5): 1954, 1955, 1956, 1959, 1963

References

Handball clubs established in 1930
Israeli handball clubs
1930 establishments in Mandatory Palestine
Sport in Rehovot